Terror in the Night (working title The Hunter) is a 1994 American made-for-television thriller film starring Joe Penny, Justine Bateman, Matt Mulhern and Valerie Landsburg. Directed by Colin Bucksey and based on actual events, the film was originally broadcast on CBS on January 11, 1994.

Plot
Based on a true story. Tom Cross and his girlfriend, Robin Andrews, are enjoying a camping trip in the mountain region of North Carolina. One night, the couple is awakened by a "police officer" who claims that he is taking them to police headquarters. Instead, they are kidnapped and terrorized by Lonnie Carter, a psychotic brutal murderer on-the-loose with his girlfriend Tina and her two children.

Cast
Joe Penny as Lonnie Carter
Justine Bateman as Robin Andrews
Matt Mulhern as Tom Cross
Valerie Landsburg as Tina
Al Wiggins as Detective Jack Waters
John Bennes as Earl Womack
Barry Bell as Ronnie Barnes

Production
The film was shot at various locations in Charlotte, North Carolina from March 15, 1993 to April 8, 1993.

References

External links

1994 films
1994 television films
1990s thriller films
American thriller films
American films based on actual events
Thriller films based on actual events
Films shot in North Carolina
Films set in forests
Films about criminals
Films about rape
American survival films
CBS network films
Alan Landsburg Productions films
1990s English-language films
1990s American films